The Nostalgia Factory, subtitled "...and other tips for amateur golfers", is the second album to be released by Steven Wilson under the pseudonym Porcupine Tree. It was the second full-length cassette produced for his 'joke' project with friend Malcom Stocks. The album was issued by Delerium in 1991 (despite the Porcupine Tree website stating 1990) in a limited edition of 300 copies.

Tracks 1 through 7, an edited version of "The Nostalgia Factory" and "This Long Silence", "Nine Cats" and "It Will Rain for a Million Years" were released on the band's first studio album, On the Sunday of Life. The rest of the songs except "Sinatra Rape Scene" were released on the compilation album Yellow Hedgerow Dreamscape, however "Colours Dance Angels Kiss" was stripped of its title, being listed as "Track Eleven", and "Hokey Cokey" was retitled "Execution of the Will of the Marquis de Sade". An edited version of "Sinatra Rape Scene" was released on the band's second album Up the Downstair in 1993 under the title "Monuments Burn into Moments", while a shorter version of "Split Image" was used as the intro to "Cloud Zero", released on the "Staircase Infinities" EP.

Track listing

"Hymn" – 1:22
"Footprints" – 5:56
"Linton Samuel Dawson" – 3:04
"And the Swallows Dance Above the Sun" – 4:12
"Queen Quotes Crowley" – 4:40
"No Luck with Rabbits" – 0:47
"Begonia Seduction Scene" – 2:34
"Colours Dance Angels Kiss" – 3:00
"Prayer" – 1:50
"The Nostalgia Factory" – 8:15
"This Long Silence" – 6:51
"Sinatra Rape Scene" – 0:39
"Hokey Cokey" – 5:05
"Landscare" – 3:16
"Delightful Suicide" – 1:12
"Nine Cats" – 3:51
"Split Image" – 1:58
"It Will Rain for a Million Years" – 10:50

Porcupine Tree albums
1991 albums